Nio Inc. (stylised as NIO) is a Chinese multinational automobile manufacturer headquartered in Shanghai, specializing in designing and developing electric vehicles. The company develops battery-swapping stations for its vehicles, as an alternative to conventional charging stations. The company has raised over $5 billions from investors. In 2021, Nio plans to expand to 25 different countries and regions by 2025.

Overview 

After the brand launch in the Saatchi Gallery in London in 2016, several companies invested in Nio, including Tencent, Temasek, Sequoia, Lenovo and TPG. Its first model, the Nio EP9 sports car, debuted the same day the brand was established.

In October 2016, Nio announced that it had been given an "Autonomous Vehicle Testing Permit" by the California DMV and it would begin testing on public roads under the "Autonomous Vehicle Tester Program" guidelines as part of its autonomous vehicle program. According to the company, it planned to launch vehicles with level-three and level-four autonomy.

In May 2018, Nio opened its first battery swap station in the Nanshan District of Shenzhen, Guangdong, China, dubbed the "Power Swap Station". Only batteries for ES8 cars would be available from this station.

In September 2018, the company filed for a US$1.8 billion initial public offering on the New York Stock Exchange.

In late April 2020, Nio announced approximately US$1 billion in new funding from a group of Chinese investors, which was needed due to the company's struggles to sell its vehicles. As part of the deal, Nio would transfer assets to a new subsidiary called Nio China, which will be headquartered in Hefei.

In August 2020, Nio launched Battery as a Service (BaaS) and formed a battery asset management company in collaboration with Contemporary Amperex Technology Co., Limited ("CATL"), Hubei Science Technology Investment Group Co., Ltd. and a subsidiary of Guotai Junan International Holdings Limited. Each contributing roughly US$31.6 million (CN¥200 million) into the venture, for 25% equity. BaaS helps lower the purchase price of Nio electric vehicles by about 25%.

In May 2021, Nio announced a Norway expansion plan, saying it would begin delivering cars to Norway by September 2021. In the third quarter of 2021, Nio delivered 24,439 ES8, ES6, and EC6, a new quarterly record representing a growth of 100.2% year over year.

At Nio Day in December 2021, Nio announced it would bring its User Enterprise to Germany, Denmark, Netherlands and Sweden in 2022.

On 22 February 2022, it was announced that Nio is planning to venture into China's smartphone market and preparing to make its own handsets. The company has formed a smartphone division in Shenzhen, and is hiring staff to expand the team. The move is preceded by similar plans to manufacture smartphones by automakers Geely and Volvo.

Vehicles 
Nio's first car was the EP9 electric hypercar, presented the same day the brand was launched. Nio revealed the ES8, a seven-seater electric SUV in December 2017 and began deliveries of the ES8 in June 2018. Nio launched the ES6, a five-seater electric SUV, in December 2018, and began deliveries in June 2019. In December 2019, Nio launched the EC6, a five-seater electric coupe SUV with deliveries beginning in September 2020. Nio launched ET7, its electric sedan, in January 2021 and revealed ET5, its most compact sedan at Nio Day in December 2021.

To date, Nio has revealed two concept cars; EVE at SXSW 2017 and ET Preview at Auto Shanghai 2019.

Concept models

Battery swapping

Nio's battery swap stations allow owners to upgrade the capacity of their battery packs, either temporarily or permanently. These battery swapping stations have a reported swapping time of under five minutes.

Unlike Tesla, which has tried battery swapping but has never deployed it on a large scale and relies instead on its Supercharger network, Nio has built a functioning network of 1,305 battery-swap stations that covers several thousand kilometres of Chinese expressways.

The first phase was installing 18 battery-swap stations in 14 different locations along the G4 expressway, a  road connecting Beijing (the national capital) with the Pearl River Delta (world's largest urban area where Hong Kong and Shenzhen are located). This was completed in November 2018.

The second phase consisted of installing battery-swap stations in 8 locations along the G2 expressway, a  road connecting Beijing with Shanghai. This phase was completed in January 2019.

On 24 March 2021, Nio completed its 2 millionth battery swap in the city of Suzhou. It has also deployed 193 battery swapping stations, 134 supercharging stations, and 327 destination stations across China.

On 10 December 2021, Nio installed its 700th battery swap station in China, hitting its annual target ahead of schedule, Nio's second-generation battery swap station allows the vehicle to automatically park into the station, with which users can experience a three-minute battery swap while staying inside the vehicle. So far, Nio has provided over 5.3 million swaps to users in China. Battery swapping has become one of the favourite power solutions among Nio users.

As of May 2022, Nio has opened its first swap station in Europe, located in Norway, with plans to expand in other cities.

As of December 31 2022, Nio built 1,305 battery swap stations over all provincial administrative regions in China. Nio currently provides an average of 40,000 battery swap services today, and a total of 15 million battery swap services.

Technologies

NOMI AI

NOMI is Nio's digital assistant for the car dashboard to provide a closer engagement with its drivers and passengers and Nio claims is the world's first in-car  AI system for production vehicles.

The NOMI Mate 2.0 features a circular AMOLED display and incorporates artificial intelligence with a human face-like interface that swivels and blinks its oval ‘eyes’ to address each vehicle occupant directly, depending on their location.

NOMI learns user preferences over time to understand the specific context of the car in relation to its owner. For example, NOMI can set the personal seating and steering wheel positions whenever it senses a driver approaching the vehicle. Users can also give NOMI verbal commands to adjust the cabin temperature, open or close windows, or snap an in-car selfie and have it displayed on the radio screen.

Nio Pilot
Nio Pilot is the company's SAE level 2 semi-autonomous system that offers ADAS features. It launched with the introduction of Nio's ES8 model. Several over the air updates throughout 2018 and 2019 has enhanced Nio Pilot with features such as lane keeping, adaptive cruise control, lane departure warning, automatic emergency braking, highway pilot (Nio Navigate on Pilot, NNOP), traffic Jam assistance, auto lane change and more.

Nio Pilot sensor suite consists of 23 sensors, including a trifocal forward camera, 5 radars, 12 ultrasonic sensors and a driver monitor camera. Nio was the first automaker to launch a car model utilizing Mobileye's EyeQ4 vision chip.

In August 2021, Lin Wenqin, a 31-year-old Chinese man, was killed after his Nio ES8 collided with a construction vehicle. Nio's self-driving feature was still in beta, and could not deal with static obstacles. Though the vehicle's manual at the time clearly stated that the driver must take over when nearing construction sites, there was an issue regarding whether the feature was improperly marketed and unsafe. Lawyers of the family of the person killed  called into question Nio's private access to the vehicle, which they argue could lead to the data being falsified.

Aquila (Nio Autonomous Driving)
In November 2019, Nio announced a partnership with Mobileye to develop a consumer car equipped with Mobileye's complete Level 4 self-driving system called Aquila that could be sold to consumers by 2022. Aquila features 33 sensors, including 11 high-resolution cameras, LiDAR, 5 radars, 12 ultrasonic sensors, and two high-precision positioning units: V2X and ADMS.

The system was first on board of the Nio ET7. The company begun deliveries of the model in Q1 of 2022.

The new Nio Adam supercomputer is one of the most powerful platforms to run in a vehicle. With four NVIDIA DRIVE Orin processors, Adam achieves more than 1,000 TOPS of performance. All of Nio’s NT 2.0 platform vehicles — such as the ET7, ET5, ES7, EC7, 2nd Gen ES8 — are built on the Nio Adam supercomputer, with four NVIDIA DRIVE Orinsystems-on-a-chip (SoC) at its core.

Production

On April 7, 2021, NIO produced its 100,000th electric vehicle.

On April 26, 2022, NIO announced its 200,000th electric car rolling off the production line.

On December 12, 2022, NIO announced it's 300,000 electric car rolling off the production line.

Divisions

Nio Life
Nio Life is the company's design lifestyle brand. The brand launched in 2018 with a capsule collection made in collaboration with Hussein Chalayan. In 2021 Nio Life launched its sustainable fashion label "Blue Sky Lab". The label collaborated with the Parsons School of Design challenging students to create new products made of leftover car manufacturer materials and, thereby, providing opportunities for young designers.

Nio Service 
Nio Service is the company's network of service centers. Nio Users can request a "pick-up-and-delivery" service for their car to the service center. Additionally, mobile service vehicles can carry out simple maintenance work on demand.

Nio Power 
Nio Power is the company's network of battery swap stations, power mobile, power home and super chargers. Nio has 1,305 swap Stations around China as of December 31, 2022, including 346 battery swap stations along highways. In addition to the 1,305 battery swap stations, Nio has 1,223 supercharging stations in China and 1,058 destination charging stations.

Management

William Li

William Li is a Chinese business executive and entrepreneur who is the founder and CEO of the electric car manufacturer Nio. In June 2021, Bloomberg Billionaires Index estimated Li's net worth to be US$7.11 billion. Li co-founded and invested in over 40 companies in the internet and automotive industries.

Awards and honours
 GQ China Entrepreneur of the Year – 2017 
 China Automobile Dealers Association Person of the Year – 2017
 2017 Top 10 Economic Personages of China 
 Forbes Most Intriguing Newcomer in the Transportation Awards – 2020

Lihong Qin

Lihong Qin is a Chinese business executive. He is a co-founder and CEO of the electric car manufacturer Nio.

Kris Tomasson
Kris Tomasson is an American industrial designer and vice president of Design at NIO.

Early life and education

Kris Tomasson was born in New York to Marlene and Helgi Tómasson. He studied transportation design at the Art Center College of Design in Pasadena, California, and graduated with honours as a Bachelor of Science (BS).

Career

After graduation, he worked as a designer in various companies, from 1992 to 1998 for the first time for BMW, then as design director, Innovation of the Arnell Group, for The Coca-Cola Company (Global Design Director), Gulfstream Aerospace, Ford and from April 2014 to May 2015 again for BMW, where he worked for the body design of the i-models was responsible. In June 2015, he moved from BMW to the Chinese start-up company Next EV.  Nio has focused on the development and production of electric cars. The design studio where Tomasson is based is located in Munich/Bogenhausen. Kris has a number of patents for his designs.

Hui Zhang
Hui Zhang is vice president Nio Europe. He manages both the German and UK locations of the electric car manufacturer.

Career

After studying in Beijing and Utah, Hui Zhang completed his MBA in International Management at Pforzheim University of Applied Sciences in 2002. Initially, he worked in purchasing and supply chain management at VOITH AG in China and Germany. After positions at KIEKERT AG as Vice general manager and at Lotus as general manager from 2011, he was responsible for the Business Group Industry and Healthcare China at Leoni AG as a China Board Member from 2014 . Hui Zhang is Deputy Chairman of the Chinese Chamber of Commerce in Germany.

Motorsport

Formula E

The Nio team is one of the original Formula E teams, originally competing under the name Team China Racing. Before the first season was completed, they rebranded as NEXTEV TCR. In this inaugural season, their main driver Nelson Piquet Jr. became the FIA Formula E Driver's Champion, after winning two races in Long Beach and Moscow. The team was only able to achieve fourth in the constructor's championship though, in part due to a rotating line-up of second drivers that didn't achieve as consistent level of success as Piquet.

From season 2 onwards, Formula E opened up car development, with teams creating their own powertrains. Nio used their own design NEXTEV powertrain, but it saw a downturn in the team's performance for the constructor's championship, as they finished only 9th in season 2, 6th in season 3 and 8th in season 4. By this point, the team had morphed through NEXTEV, NEXTEV Nio until renamed simply Nio. Season 5 would see the team's meagre successes diminish further, as they languished 11th and last in the championship.

For season 6 (2019–20) the team was sold on to Lisheng Racing and renamed Nio 333 Racing. For the first time since season 1, Nio did not provide their own powertrain for the car, instead using the previous year's Dragon powertrain. It was rebranded under Nio's name and they remained classified as a manufacturer. This didn't change the team's fortunes, as they would go on to have their worst ever season, with neither Oliver Turvey nor Ma Qinghua being able to score any points in 2020. In season seven Nio improved marginally, as whilst Turvey and new arrival Tom Blomqvist amassed a total of 19 points throughout the campaign, the squad still remained in last place.

Nio once again changed their driver line-up for the 2021–22 Formula E season, as Blomqvist made way for former Red Bull and Williams junior Dan Ticktum.

World records 
Nio set five records in their track-only EP9 for the fastest lap for an electric-powered car in the Nürburgring Nordschleife, Circuit Paul Ricard, Circuit of the Americas, and Shanghai International Circuit tracks.

Public listing 
In Sep 2018, Nio listed on NYSE after raising about $1 billion selling American depositary shares at $6.26 apiece. The shares started trading under the symbol NIO.

In 2018, while Nio was preparing for an IPO, the company told investors that they were building a new factory in Shanghai. Then in March 2019, Nio disclosed that the factory would never be built. According to former employees, construction had never started. Investors sued and accused Nio's promoters, which included Morgan Stanley and Goldman Sachs, of negligence in examining Nio's financial statements.

See also
 New energy vehicles in China
 Byton
 Polestar
 Tesla, Inc.
 XPeng

References

External links
 

 
Electric vehicle manufacturers of China
Battery electric vehicle manufacturers
Car brands
Car manufacturers of China
Multinational companies headquartered in China
Vehicle manufacturing companies established in 2014
Chinese companies established in 2014
2018 initial public offerings
Companies listed on the New York Stock Exchange
Chinese brands
Luxury motor vehicle manufacturers
Sports car manufacturers